Wareham railway station serves the town of Wareham in Dorset, England. On tickets it is printed "Wareham Dorset" to avoid confusion with Ware railway station.

History 

The original Wareham station was built to serve the Southampton and Dorchester Railway and opened in 1847. 
The current station opened in 1887, replacing the original station, and was sited east of what is now only a pedestrian crossing but was once a busy road level crossing (the road now bridges the railway) This station had two bay platforms which served the branch line to Swanage from 1885 until 1972, when the branch closed.

The branch line to Swanage is now the preserved Swanage Railway, a steam locomotive operated heritage railway that currently operates between Swanage and a Park and Ride site at Norden just north of Corfe Castle.

The rail connection between the Swanage Railway and the Network Rail tracks at Worgret Junction has been restored, restoring a connection with the National Rail network. On Summer Saturdays trains run through from a number of South Western Railway stations, including London Waterloo and Salisbury through Wareham to Corfe Castle to link with Swanage Railway services.

Services 

Wareham station is served by one South Western Railway services an hour from London Waterloo to Weymouth, strengthened to twice per hour on Saturdays, with a Class 444. Prior to 9 December 2007 it was the terminus for an hourly local service from Brockenhurst, but this has now been partially replaced by the additional Weymouth service.

Until 1967, trains through the station were normally steam hauled. Class 205 (2H) diesel electric multiple units were used during the final years of British Rail operation on the Swanage branch. Between 1967 and 1988, passenger services on the London-Weymouth line were normally provided by Class 33/1 diesel locomotives with Class 438 coaching stock (also known as 4-TC units). The line was electrified in 1988, using the standard British Rail Southern Region direct current third rail at 750 volts. After electrification, Class 442 electric multiple units were initially used, but these were replaced by Class 444 electric multiple units in 2007.

Heritage 
The Swanage Railway is connected and fully accessible from the main line at Worgret Junction, although the normal steam service on the line still runs from Swanage and terminates at Norden station near Corfe Castle. Certain services were extended to terminate at Wareham, allowing interchange with the main line. This was achieved on 13 June 2017 when a four-coach diesel-hauled trial service began running to Wareham. This was the first train to work between the two towns since the Swanage branch closed in 1972.   Special services operated between Wareham and Swanage on some dates during the summer of 2017 as a trial, a further trial is planned but no dates announced as yet (Nov 2021).

References

Railway stations in Dorset
Railway stations in Great Britain opened in 1887
Former London and South Western Railway stations
Railway stations served by South Western Railway
Wareham, Dorset
DfT Category D stations